W. Wilkinson was a British major general known to have commanded forces at Bombay in 1813.

References

Year of birth missing
Year of death missing
British Army generals